Lexington Depot, or Lexington station, is a former train station in Lexington, Massachusetts on the Lexington Branch.

History

The station opened in 1846 as part of the Lexington and West Cambridge Railroad. It was damaged by fire on November 24, 1918. Although a new station was planned, the old station was instead restored in 1921–22. These renovations, designed by Kilham, Hopkins & Greeley, included a cupola and colonnade.

The line became part of the Massachusetts Bay Transportation Authority (MBTA) Commuter Rail system in the 1960s, though the station building was converted to a bank by 1968.

The building now serves as the headquarters of the Lexington Historical Society.  The Minuteman Bikeway runs through the former trainshed adjacent to the former station platforms. Lexington and Bedford Depot are the only remaining station buildings from the Lexington Branch.

References

External links

MBTA Commuter Rail stations in Middlesex County, Massachusetts
Former MBTA stations in Massachusetts
Historic American Engineering Record in Massachusetts
Lexington, Massachusetts
Railway stations in the United States opened in 1846
Railway stations closed in 1977
1846 establishments in Massachusetts